Kūaotunu is a small coastal township at the east coast of the Coromandel Peninsula on the mouth of the Kuaotunu River on the North Island of New Zealand.

Name
The name of the settlement is of Māori origin, meaning ‘to inspire fear in young animals’ or ‘roasted young’, probably relating to the good hunting and fishing grounds in the area. In 2019, the name of the locality was officially gazetted as Kūaotunu.

Demographics
Kūaotunu is described by Statistics New Zealand as a rural settlement. Kūaotunu is part of the larger Mercury Bay North statistical area.

Kūaotunu had a population of 234 at the 2018 New Zealand census, an increase of 21 people (9.9%) since the 2013 census, and an increase of 9 people (4.0%) since the 2006 census. There were 84 households, comprising 117 males and 111 females, giving a sex ratio of 1.05 males per female, with 36 people (15.4%) aged under 15 years, 30 (12.8%) aged 15 to 29, 126 (53.8%) aged 30 to 64, and 42 (17.9%) aged 65 or older.

Ethnicities were 92.3% European/Pākehā, 11.5% Māori, 1.3% Pacific peoples, 1.3% Asian, and 1.3% other ethnicities. People may identify with more than one ethnicity.

Although some people chose not to answer the census's question about religious affiliation, 67.9% had no religion, 20.5% were Christian and 5.1% had other religions.

Of those at least 15 years old, 42 (21.2%) people had a bachelor's or higher degree, and 18 (9.1%) people had no formal qualifications. 24 people (12.1%) earned over $70,000 compared to 17.2% nationally. The employment status of those at least 15 was that 84 (42.4%) people were employed full-time, 48 (24.2%) were part-time, and 3 (1.5%) were unemployed.

Tourism 
Kūaotunu is a popular destination for summer holidays for tourists on the Coromandel tourist circuit. It is one of the most northern beaches on the east coast of the Coromandel Peninsula and is popular with campers, surfers and beach lovers.

Mining 

The local mines and their stamping batteries, which were installed in the late 19th century, had hopeful names: Try Fluke, Carbine, Mariposa, John Bull, Great Mercury, Red Mercury, Irene, Waiawa, Otama and Kapai-Vermont.

The Try Fluke Mine was a substantial gold mine close to Kūaotunu. Its name goes back to its discovery in 1889, when  prospectors asked the Maori Charles Kawhine, known locally as Coffin, what he was doing, and he replied: "Oh, try fluke." At least this was understood instead of "Tryin’ luck", and the name stuck to the mine, which was established there.

The mine consisted of several vertical shafts and horizontal tunnels, also known as adits or drives, down the hill side. It is still possible to explore some of these drives. One of them runs 50 m into the mountain, ending at a filled-in shaft. In front of the mine is a flat strip of ground, where mining railway used to run. More than 2760 ounces of gold have been extracted by January 1893, after implementing the Cassel cyanide process, by which the level of gold recoverable was increased from 55% to 95%. Official production data by the Thames Mines show a yield of 2,327,619 oz bullion with a value of NZ$845 mio.

Logging 

Logging played only a secondary role in the area, but mines needed Kauri timber both for construction and for heating the ore ovens. Local loggers thus operated a narrow gauge logging railway including a small steam engine.

The locomotive with a gauge of probably  had been imported from Manning, Wardle & Co in Hunslet, England with works number 859 from 1883. This procedure reduced the risk of derailments of the loaded bogies, because pulling caused less derailments than pushing.

The Kūaotunu bush contained approximately 6 mio super feet of timber. E.H. Irving worked it from 1907 to 1909 as a contractor to the Kauri Timber Company (KTC). He and his bushmen felled and transported the logs to the Whangapoua Harbour estuary, where they were dumped, made up into rafts, and towed by powerful steamer to a KTC sawmill.

Church 
A church, St Columcille's, was built in 1893, when the town had approximately 2,000 inhabitants. The church cost 100 pounds to build, and was inaugurated free of debt. The material for the Roman Catholic Church at Kūaotunu arrived in January 1893 by ship, and was carted from the beach to the site near to the public school is. The building was disassembled in 1954 and re-erected at Tairua.

External links
What's left to see? Kuaotunu's Mining Areas.

References

Thames-Coromandel District
Populated places in Waikato
Mining railways in New Zealand
Logging railways in New Zealand